The 64th Filmfare Awards South ceremony honoring the winners and nominees of the best of South Indian cinema in 2016 is an event that was held on 17 June 2017 at Novotel and HICC Complex in Hyderabad. The nominations for all the main awards were declared on 8 June 2017.

List of winners and nominees

Main awards

Winners are listed first, highlighted in boldface.

Kannada cinema

Malayalam cinema

Tamil cinema

Telugu cinema

Technical Awards

Special awards

References

General

Specific

External links
 
 

Filmfare Awards South
2017 Indian film awards